is an action role-playing video game developed by Produce! and published by Enix for the Super NES. It was only released in Japan and North America.

Gameplay
Most of the game takes place in dungeons, with a heavy emphasis on puzzles.

The player takes on the role of a young adventurer who can have up to two jades, creatures that perform tasks such as healing or long range attacks, following the player character at one time. There are five dungeons in the game: The Tower of Light, Ancient Ruins, the Ice Castle, Droog Volcano, and Platinum. The player starts out in the town of Arcs; there is only one other town, Toronto. In Toronto there is a battle arena in which the player can fight for money. The player can also bet on other competitors. 

The video game features several kinds of weapons including bows, boomerangs, swords, axes, and flails. Defeated enemies yield gold. Throughout the game the player can acquire better armor and weapons to increase his defensive and offensive capabilities, similar to The Legend of Zelda series.

The jades that accompany the protagonist can level up by picking up blue 'XP' orbs that are dropped randomly by defeated enemies.

Plot
Remeer's father, the last of the dragon warriors, was sent on a quest to find the last of the dragons terrorizing the village. His father never returned.

Years later Remeer sets out on his own journey to find out what happened to his father. Remeer is joined by his four friends: Kashian (a bounty hunter), Barness (a spiritual guru), Rein (a warrior), and Ferris (a witch). Each help him as he makes his way through the five dungeons in the land.

Remeer (or its equivalent 'Lemele') is used for prominent characters in two more video games developed by Produce! and published by Enix, The 7th Saga and Mystic Ark.

Reception

Electronic Gaming Monthly commented that Brain Lord strikes a nice balance between the action and RPG elements, and they also praised the "atmospheric" music.

References

External links
 

Role-playing video games
Enix games
Fantasy video games
Action role-playing video games
Produce! games
Super Nintendo Entertainment System games
Super Nintendo Entertainment System-only games
Top-down video games
Video games developed in Japan
1994 video games
Single-player video games